Wando (February 23, 2000 – January 22, 2014) was a Thoroughbred racehorse who won the Canadian Triple Crown in 2003. Wando was bred by Gustav Schickedanz at his farm Schomberg Farms in Schomberg, Ontario and ridden mainly by jockey Patrick Husbands. The chestnut stallion raced with moderate success as a four-year-old, and was then retired on 12 May 2005 to stand at stud at Lane's End Farm near Lexington, Kentucky. In 2011, the stallion returned to Schomberg, where he died of a heart attack on January 22, 2014. He is buried at Schomberg Farms.

In 2014, Wando was inducted into the Canadian Horse Racing Hall of Fame.

External links
 Wando's pedigree, with photo

References

2000 racehorse births
2014 racehorse deaths
Racehorses bred in King, Ontario
Racehorses trained in Canada
King's Plate winners
Sovereign Award winners
Canadian Thoroughbred Horse of the Year
Triple Crown of Thoroughbred Racing winners
Canadian Horse Racing Hall of Fame inductees
Thoroughbred family 9-d